Estadio Héroe de Nacozari is a multi-use stadium in Hermosillo, Sonora, Mexico.  It is currently used mostly for football matches and is the home stadium of the Cimarrones de Sonora of the Ascenso MX. The stadium holds 18,747 people.

The name Héroe de Nacozari ("Hero of Nacozari") honors Hermosillo native Jesús García who, in 1907, saved the city of Nacozari, Sonora, from destruction by a fire aboard a dynamite train.

The stadium was opened on August 4, 1985. On December 6, 1995, the Mexico national football team played a friendly match against Slovenia in this stadium.

References

Heroe de Nacozari
Sports venues in Sonora
Hermosillo